Bologoye is the name of several inhabited localities in Russia.

Urban localities
Bologoye, Tver Oblast, a town in Bologovsky District of Tver Oblast

Rural localities
Bologoye, Omsk Oblast, a selo in Rozovsky Rural Okrug of Russko-Polyansky District in Omsk Oblast
Bologoye, Pskov Oblast, a village in Novosokolnichesky District of Pskov Oblast